Weinert is a surname. Notable people with the surname include:

Erich Weinert (1890–1953), German writer
Jimmy Weinert (born 1951), American motocross and supercross rider
Lefty Weinert (1900–1973), American baseball player 
Paul H. Weinert (1869–1919), American soldier
Rudolph A. Weinert (c. 1885–1974), American politician

See also
Weinert Center in Madison, Wisconsin, United States